Ramón de Zubiaurre (1 September 1882 – 9 June 1969) was a Spanish artist. His work was part of the art competition at the 1932 Summer Olympics.

References

Further reading
 Ramón de Zubiaurre, in memoriam, Laureano Muñoz Viñarás. Diario "Hierro", Bilbao, 14-VI-69.
 Ramón de Zubiaurre, el pintor y el hombre, Takeshi Mochizuki. Diputación Foral de Vizcaya, 1980.
 Los hermanos Zubiaurre, Xabier Sáenz de Gorbea. Caja de Ahorros Vizcaína, 1982.
 Valentín de Zubiaurre. Vida y obra (doctoral thesis). Rebecca Guerra Pérez. Universidad del País Vasco. Bilbao, 2012.

1882 births
1969 deaths
Spanish artists
Olympic competitors in art competitions
People from Biscay